Javier López (born 15 March 1989) is a Spanish sports shooter. He competed in the Men's 10 metre air rifle, men's 50 m rifle prone and men's 50 m rifle 3 positions events at the 2012 Summer Olympics.

References

1989 births
Living people
Spanish male sport shooters
Olympic shooters of Spain
Shooters at the 2012 Summer Olympics
Sportspeople from Murcia
European Games competitors for Spain
Shooters at the 2015 European Games
21st-century Spanish people